Micklethwait is a surname. Notable people with the surname include:

Frances Micklethwait (1867–1950), English chemist
Frederick Micklethwait (1817–1878), English lawyer and cricketer
John Micklethwait (born 1962), British journalist
Sotherton Micklethwait (1823–1889), English Anglican priest and cricketer
William Micklethwait (1885–1947), English cricketer

See also
Micklethwait baronets